The Akeno Giant Air Shower Array (AGASA) is a very 
large surface array designed to study the origin of ultra-high-energy cosmic rays. Located in the town of Akeno in Yamanashi prefecture, Japan, it covers an area of 100 km2 and consists of 111 surface detectors and 27 muon detectors. Array experiments such as this one are used to detect air shower particles.

The array is operated by the Institute for Cosmic Ray Research, University of Tokyo at the Akeno Observatory.

Results
The results from AGASA were used to calculate the energy spectrum and anisotropy of cosmic rays. The results helped to confirm the existence of ultra-high energy cosmic rays (>), such as the so-called "Oh-My-God" particle that was observed by the Fly's Eye experiment run by the University of Utah.

The Telescope Array, a merger of the AGASA and High Resolution Fly's Eye (HiRes) groups, and the Pierre Auger Observatory have improved on the results from AGASA by building larger, hybrid detectors and collecting greater quantities of more precise data.

See also
 CREDO
 Extragalactic cosmic ray
 Gamma-ray telescopes  (Alphabetic list)
 Gamma-ray astronomy & X-ray astronomy
 Cosmic Ray System (CR instrument on the Voyagers)

References

External links
AGASA.
High Resolution Fly's Eye

High energy particle telescopes
Cosmic-ray experiments